Ludwig II (German: Ludwig II: Glanz und Ende eines Königs) is a 1955 West German historical drama film directed by Helmut Käutner and starring O.W. Fischer, Ruth Leuwerik and Marianne Koch. It is based on the life of the nineteenth century ruler Ludwig II of Bavaria.  It was entered into the 1955 Cannes Film Festival. The film was shot in technicolor at the Bavaria Studios in Munich with sets designed by the art director Hein Heckroth and Fritz Lück. Location shooting took place at the historic residences of Ludwig II Herrenchiemsee, Neuschwanstein Castle and Hohenschwangau Castle.

Cast
 O.W. Fischer as Ludwig II
 Ruth Leuwerik as Elisabeth, Empress of Austria
 Marianne Koch as Princess Sophie
 Paul Bildt as Richard Wagner
 Friedrich Domin as Otto von Bismarck
 Rolf Kutschera as 
 Herbert Hübner as von Pfistermeister
 Robert Meyn as Professor Dr. Gudden
 Rudolf Fernau as Prince Luitpold von Bayern
 Willy Rösner as Minister von Lutz
 Klaus Kinski as Prince Otto von Bayern
 Fritz Odemar as General von der Tann
 Erik Frey as Emperor Franz Joseph I of Austria
 Albert Johannes as Fürst Hohenfels
 Erica Balqué as Cosima von Bülow
 Walter Regelsberger as Graf Dürckheim
 Hans Quest as Kapellmeister Eckert

References

Bibliography
 Mitchell, Charles P. The Great Composers Portrayed on Film, 1913 through 2002. McFarland, 2004.
 Reimer, Robert C. & Reimer, Carol J. The A to Z of German Cinema. Scarecrow Press, 2010.

External links
 

1955 films
1955 drama films
1950s biographical drama films
1950s historical drama films
German biographical drama films
German historical drama films
West German films
1950s German-language films
Biographical films about German royalty
Biographical films about Austrian royalty
Films directed by Helmut Käutner
Films set in Bavaria
Films set in the 1860s
Films set in the 1870s
Films set in the 1880s
Films set in castles
Films set in the Kingdom of Bavaria
Cultural depictions of Ludwig II of Bavaria
Cultural depictions of Otto von Bismarck
Cultural depictions of Richard Wagner
Cultural depictions of Empress Elisabeth of Austria
Cultural depictions of Franz Joseph I of Austria
1950s German films
Films shot at Bavaria Studios
Films shot in Bavaria